Adara (also Eda and Kadara), is a language spoken by Adara people of Kaduna state and Niger state of Nigeria. The name Adara is also used to refer to the ethnic group.

Some estimates place the population of the Adara people at around 500,000. About 80% of the Adara are Christians while some also adhere to Islam.

Distribution
Adara is spoken mainly in Kachia and Kajuru Local Government Areas as well as parts of Chikun and Kagarko of Kaduna state. In Paikoro and Munya local governments areas of Niger State in the Middle Belt region of Nigeria.

NOTABLE PEOPLE IN ADARA: Mr. Williams Dogo central Bank of Nigeria, Stephen Manya former inec commissioner, Abraham Alabura Katoh Pdp publicity Secretary of Kaduna state, pharm Patrick Maigara for commissioner for health Kaduna state, Dr  Everton Peter Yari former commissioner for health, Mr. Tom Maiyashi, Dr.maiwada Raphael Galadima Agom Adara, Sani Magaji former commissioner of police Ondo state.

Dialects
Dialects of the Adara language include the Adara dialect, Eneje, Ada, Ekhwa, and Ajiya.

Blench (2019) lists Eda, Edra, and Enezhe as dialects.

Phonology

Consonants

Vowels

References

Further reading
A Sociolinguistic Survey of the Adara of Kaduna and Niger States, Nigeria

External links
 Listen to a sample of Adara from Global Recordings Network
 Eda wordlist (with English and Hausa)

Central Plateau languages
Languages of Nigeria